The Feechopf is a mountain of the Swiss Pennine Alps, located near Saas Fee in the canton of Valais. It lies between the Alphubel and the Allalinhorn.

References

External links
 
 Feechopf on Hikr

Mountains of the Alps
Alpine three-thousanders
Mountains of Switzerland
Mountains of Valais
Three-thousanders of Switzerland